Kemulariella is a genus of flowering plants in the family Asteraceae.

 Species
 Kemulariella abchasica (Kem.-Nath.) Tamamsch. - Republic of Georgia
 Kemulariella caucasica (Willd.) Tamansch. - Republic of Georgia, North Caucasus
 Kemulariella colchica (Albov) Tamamsch. - Republic of Georgia, Asiatic Turkey
 Kemulariella rosea (Steven) Tamamsch. - Azerbaijan, Daghestan
 Kemulariella tuganiana (Albov) Tamamsch. - Republic of Georgia

References

Asteraceae genera
Astereae